This list is of the Places of Scenic Beauty of Japan located within the Prefecture of Nara.

National Places of Scenic Beauty
As of 1 June 2020, fourteen Places have been designated at a national level (including three *Special Places of Scenic Beauty); Dorohatchō spans the prefectural borders with Wakayama and Mie.

Prefectural Places of Scenic Beauty
As of 1 May 2019, four Places have been designated at a prefectural level.

Municipal Places of Scenic Beauty
As of 1 May 2019, three Places have been designated at a municipal level.

See also
 Cultural Properties of Japan
 List of Historic Sites of Japan (Nara)
 List of parks and gardens of Nara Prefecture

References

External links
  Cultural Properties of Nara Prefecture

Tourist attractions in Nara Prefecture
Places of Scenic Beauty